Love Off the Cuff is a 2017 Hong Kong-Chinese romantic comedy film directed by Pang Ho-cheung and starring Miriam Yeung and Shawn Yue. Shot in Hong Kong and Taipei, the film is the sequel to the 2012 film Love in the Buff and the third installment in the Love in a Puff film series.

The film had its world premiere at the 41st Hong Kong International Film Festival on April 11, 2017, and was released in Hong Kong on April 27, 2017 and in mainland China on April 28, 2017.

Plot
In the third installment of "Love In The Puff" series, Jimmy and Cherie find their relationship has become somewhat mundane and stale after seven years together.  Various events occur which put their relationship to the test, including one time being too tired to make love, a misunderstanding resulting from Cherie's pet dog copulating with a stranger's dog, the sudden appearance of Jimmy's attractive, and younger childhood friend Flora, a happenstance discussion about marrying to have kids, and Flora wanting Jimmy's sperm for artificial insemination. When an earthquake occurs while they are vacationing in Taiwan, it triggers a sequence of events that lead to Cherie deciding to break it off with Jimmy. During their time apart, they both reflect on what each wants out of their relationship.  Jimmy realizes what he wants and comes to understand what Cherie wants, and then proposes to her.

Cast

Miriam Yeung as Cherie Yu
Shawn Yue as Jimmy Cheung
Paul Chun as Cherie's father
Jiang Mengjie as Flora
Wang Xiaochen as Apple
Siu Yam-yam as Cherie's mother
Derek Tsang as Cherie's younger brother
Roy Szeto as Li
Vincent Kok as Tat
Jo Kuk
Isabel Chan as Isabel
Mia Yam as Mandy Fung
June Lam as Brenda
Toby Lee as Photographer
Stephanie Au
Jan Lamb as Manager
Sammy Leung as Hairstylist
Dada Chan
Hugo Ng
Rainy Kuo
Tarah Chan
Matt Chow
Lawrence Chou
Koyi Mak
Subyub Lee

Soundtrack

Featured songs

Release
Love Off the Cuff was released in Hong Kong on 27 April 2017. It was the highest grossing local film in Hong Kong in 2017, grossing $3.87 million (HK$30.26 million).

Awards and nominations

Trivia
The movie joins in the Last Flight (film) footage set on a LCD screen inside the airplane as an footage.

References

External links
 

2017 films
2010s Cantonese-language films
Hong Kong romantic comedy films
2017 romantic comedy films
Media Asia films
Hong Kong sequel films
Films directed by Pang Ho-cheung
Films set in Hong Kong
Films set in Taiwan
Films shot in Hong Kong
Films shot in Taiwan
Chinese romantic comedy films
2010s Mandarin-language films
2010s Hong Kong films